The Iscor Newcastle Classic was a golf tournament formerly played on the Sunshine Tour in South Africa. It was first played in the 1980s when the Tour was known as the South African Winter Tour. The 1991 champion was Retief Goosen, who made the Newcastle Classic his first professional win. Goosen would go on to win two U.S. Opens. The last Newcastle Classic was played in the 1996/1997 season.

Winners
1996  John Nelson
1995  Steve van Vuuren
1994   Ian Hutchings
1993  Brett Liddle
1992  Derek James
1991  Retief Goosen
1990 
1989  Des Terblanche

References

Golf tournaments in South Africa
Former Sunshine Tour events